Kin (stylized as KIN (←→)) is a studio album by American jazz guitarist Pat Metheny and his Unity Group, an expanded version of 2012's Unity Band, with multi-instrumentalist Giulio Carmassi and saxophonist Chris Potter. Kin was released in February 2014 by Nonesuch Records. It was recorded in June 2013 at MSR Studios in New York.

Background 
Metheny has said that his idea behind Kin was to push the quartet-led concept that led to Unity Band further forward by adding more orchestration to the instrumental core of the band, so that Kin would be "more like the Technicolor, IMAX version of what a band like this could be—but with that hardcore thing still sitting right in the middle of it all." The album also re-explores the concepts of world view, unity and the global village explored on previous Pat Metheny Group albums such as Letter from Home and We Live Here.

Reception 
The reviewer Thom Jurek of AllMusic.com awarded the album 4 stars. Geoffrey Himes at JazzTimes wrote, "Melody writing is the most underrated skill in jazz today, perhaps because it's also the rarest. There are thousands of jazz musicians who congratulate themselves on writing in 7/4 and 9/4 and on shifting their solos from tonal to atonal and back again. But how many of them can write a ballad that someone might want to hum to a lover?" Rob Mallows of London Jazz News wrote, "The album gives the listener a full understanding of what Metheny, now nearly sixty, is all about and where he feels comfortable in his role as grand master of contemporary jazz."

Track listing

Personnel 
 Pat Metheny – acoustic and electric guitars, guitar synthesizer, electronics, orchestrionics, synthesizers
 Chris Potter – tenor saxophone, bass clarinet, soprano saxophone, clarinet, alto flute, bass flute
 Giulio Carmassi – piano, trumpet, trombone, French horn, cello, vibraphone, clarinet, flute, recorder, alto saxophone, Wurlitzer, whistling, vocals
 Ben Williams – acoustic and electric bass
 Antonio Sánchez – drums and cajón

Charts

References 

2014 albums
Pat Metheny albums
Instrumental albums
Nonesuch Records albums